Fishermen at Sea, sometimes known as the Cholmeley Sea Piece, is an early oil painting by English artist J. M. W. Turner.  It was exhibited at the Royal Academy in 1796 and has been owned by the Tate Gallery since 1972.  It was the first oil painting by Turner to be exhibited at the Royal Academy.  It was praised by contemporary critics and burnished Turner's reputation, both as an oil painter and as a painter of maritime scenes.

Description
The painting measures  and is an oil painting.  Fisherman at Sea depicts a moonlit view of fishermen on rough seas near the Isle of Wight, and is a work of marine art.  It juxtaposes the fragility of human life, represented by the small boat with its flickering lamp, and the sublime power of nature, represented by the dark clouded sky, the wide sea, and the threatening rocks in the background.  The cold light of the Moon at night contrasts with the warmer glow of the fishermen's lantern.  The chalk formations on the left of the work were traditionally thought to be the Needles on the western tip of the island; however, this has been contested, with some scholars suggesting that the chalk cliffs are instead the ones at the nearby Freshwater Bay.

The work shows strong influence from the work of artists such as Claude Joseph Vernet, Philip James de Loutherbourg, and the intimate nocturnal scenes of Joseph Wright of Derby, especially in its handling of light and shadow.

Creation and history
Turner enrolled at the Royal Academy of Arts at the age of 15.  He began as primarily a watercolour painter in the early 1790s.  He likely experimented with oil privately while in the Academy's schools, but if so, these oil paintings were not publicly shown and were lost.  In general, oil paintings were considered more prestigious in the era, and Turner recognized he would have to create them if he was to gain the recognition he craved; Fishermen would be his first major oil painting.  Turner had also done maritime scenes in watercolour during the early 1790s, showing an early interest in them.  He traveled to the Isle of Wight in 1795 and took a sketchbook with him; the drawings and watercolours made then may have been used as reference material when composing Fishermen at Sea.  Turner had just turned twenty-one years old before the 1796 Royal Academy exhibition where Fishermen was unveiled to the public.

 
The two paintings Fishermen at Sea and Moonlight, a Study at Millbank was sold together to an obscure person called "General Stewart" for £10 (adjusting for inflation, around £1300–1400 in 2022 currency).  The painting was acquired by Sir Henry Charles Englefield; after his death in 1822, it was sold at Christie's on 8 March 1823, as View of the Needles, with the effect of Moon and Fire Light. It was bought by Englefield's nephew Francis Cholmeley, and it remained in the Cholmeley family for nearly 150 years, displayed at Brandsby Hall, and it became known as the Cholmeley Sea Piece.   It was loaned regularly to the Tate Gallery from 1931, and sold to the Tate Gallery in 1972 by Francis William Alfred Fairfax-Cholmeley, with finance from the Beatrice Lizzie Benson Fund.

Similar works
Fishermen strengthened Turner's reputation.  Possibly due to the Napoleonic Wars and the romantic importance of the sea and the British Navy during them, marine art was popular in Britain in the decades following Fishermen; Turner produced a number of similar works of marine art that sold for good prices.  Years later, Turner made a similar watercolour study, Moonlight at Sea (c. 1818), for his Liber Studiorum, although the engraved plate was not published.  Other Turner pieces that play with the interaction of moonlight and the sea include Shields, on the River Tyne (1823), Temple of Poseidon at Sunion, Cape Colonna (c. 1834), Disaster at Sea (c. 1833–35), and Keelmen Heaving in Coals by Moonlight (1835).  Turner would revisit marine art with new vigor in the 1830s and onward; in the 1840s, seascapes would account for three-quarters of Turner's overall output.

Analysis
The contemporary journalist Anthony Pasquin (John Williams) gave a recommendation for the piece, writing that the painting "is one of the greatest proofs of an original mind, in the present pictorial display: the boats are buoyant and swim well, and the undulation of the element is admirably deceiving."  Art historian Andrew Wilton wrote in 1987 that the painting "is a summary of all that had been said about the sea by the artists of the 18th century."

Notes

References

External links 
 Joseph Mallord William Turner, Fishermen at Sea, exhibited 1796, Tate Gallery
 Joseph Mallord William Turner, Moonlight at Sea (The Needles), c. 1818, Tate Gallery
 Fishermen at Sea, Google Cultural Institute

1796 paintings
Paintings by J. M. W. Turner
Collection of the Tate galleries
Maritime paintings
Moon in art
Culture on the Isle of Wight